Wattle Flat may refer to the following places in Australia:

Wattle Flat, New South Wales
Wattle Flat, South Australia
Wattle Flat, Victoria